Alexander Lasutkin (born June 26, 1983) is a cross-country skier from Belarus. He competed for Belarus at the 2014 Winter Olympics in the cross country skiing events.

References

1983 births
Living people
Olympic cross-country skiers of Belarus
Cross-country skiers at the 2006 Winter Olympics
Cross-country skiers at the 2014 Winter Olympics
Belarusian male cross-country skiers
Tour de Ski skiers
Universiade gold medalists for Belarus
Universiade medalists in cross-country skiing
Cross-country skiers at the 2007 Winter Universiade
Medalists at the 2007 Winter Universiade